Brent Foster (born 23 May 1967) is an athlete from New Zealand. As a swimmer and triathlete he has taken part in surf lifesaving and  Ironman competitions and represented his country at the Commonwealth Games.

He was a member of the world champion New Zealand team at the 1998 World Surf Lifesaving Championship, and has set the swim course record at the New Zealand Ironman.
In 2008 Foster won the Elite Men category of the ITU Aquathlon World Championships in Monterrey, Mexico.

Commonwealth Games
Foster competed at the Commonwealth Games in 1986 and 1990.

References

External links
 Foster's website

New Zealand male triathletes
Living people
1967 births
Swimmers at the 1986 Commonwealth Games
Swimmers at the 1990 Commonwealth Games
Commonwealth Games competitors for New Zealand